Richard Hanson Weightman (December 28, 1816 – August 10, 1861) was an antebellum delegate to the United States Congress from the Territory of New Mexico. He was also a district commander of the secessionist Missouri State Guard during the American Civil War, and was killed in action at the Battle of Wilson's Creek in Missouri.

Biography
Born in Washington, D.C., where his father Roger C. Weightman later served as mayor, Weightman attended private schools there and in Alexandria, Virginia. He graduated from the University of Virginia at Charlottesville in 1834 and attended the United States Military Academy at West Point, 1835–1837, but was expelled for contemplating a duel. He subsequently studied law and was admitted to the bar in 1841 in the District of Columbia, but did not practice.

Weightman moved to St. Louis, Missouri, and on May 28, 1846, was elected captain of Clark's Battalion, Missouri Volunteer Light Artillery, in the Mexican War, later fighting in the Battle of Sacramento. He served as Additional Paymaster, Volunteers, in the Army in 1848 and 1849 and left the service as a Major. He moved to New Mexico Territory in 1851 and edited a newspaper in Santa Fe. He was appointed agent for Indians in New Mexico in July 1851. While in Santa Fe in August 1854, he killed François Xavier Aubry (December 3, 1824 – August 18, 1854) who was a French Canadian merchant and explorer of the American Southwest. When Aubry drew his revolver, Weightman stabbed Aubry with a Bowie knife.

Weightman was elected as a Democrat as the New Mexico Territory's Delegate to the Thirty-second Congress (March 4, 1851 – March 3, 1853). He was not a candidate for reelection in 1852, and went back to newspaper work. In 1858 he moved to Kickapoo and Atchison, Kansas, and in 1861 to Independence, Missouri.

On June 11, 1861, Weightman was elected as colonel of the First Regiment Cavalry, Eighth Division, Missouri State Guard, Confederate States Army. He was promoted to command of the First Brigade, Eighth Division, June 20, 1861, and led it competently at the Battle of Carthage on July 5 1861. 

Colonel Richard Hanson Weightman was killed while leading his brigade at the Battle of Wilson's Creek in Missouri on August 10, 1861, and was buried on the battlefield near Springfield, Missouri.

Notes

References
 Retrieved on 2009-5-11

1816 births
1861 deaths
Delegates to the United States House of Representatives from New Mexico Territory
Politicians from Washington, D.C.
Missouri State Guard
Confederate States of America military personnel killed in the American Civil War
People of Missouri in the American Civil War
United States Military Academy alumni
American military personnel of the Mexican–American War
19th-century American politicians
New Mexico Democrats
United States politicians killed during the Civil War
Burials at Springfield National Cemetery